Kerry Michael Dineen (July 1, 1952 – November 21, 2015) was an American professional baseball player. He never appeared in more than seven games in any single season. Dineen is the first cousin of former big leaguer Ken Henderson.

Dineen attended the University of San Diego, where he played college baseball for the Toreros from 1971-73.

Dineen died of cancer in Henderson, Nevada on November 21, 2015.

References

External links

Major League Baseball outfielders
New York Yankees players
Philadelphia Phillies players
Oneonta Yankees players
West Haven Yankees players
Syracuse Chiefs players
Oklahoma City 89ers players
Baseball players from New Jersey
People from Englewood, New Jersey
Sportspeople from Bergen County, New Jersey
San Diego Toreros baseball players
Deaths from cancer in Nevada
1952 births
2015 deaths
Alaska Goldpanners of Fairbanks players